Novelty is a requirement for a patent claim to be patentable. An invention is not new and therefore not patentable if it was known to the public before the filing date of the patent application, or before its date of priority if the applicant claims priority of an earlier patent application. The purpose of the novelty requirement is to prevent prior art from being patented again.

Definition
Novelty is requirement for a patent claim to be patentable. In contrast, if an invention was known to the public before filing a patent application, or before its date of priority, if the priority of an earlier patent application is claimed, the invention is not considered new and therefore not patentable.

To assess the novelty of an invention, a search through what is called the prior art is usually performed, the term "art" referring to the relevant technical field.  A prior art search is generally performed with a view to proving that the invention is "not new" or old.  No search can possibly cover every single publication or use on earth, and therefore cannot prove that an invention is "new". A prior art search may for instance be performed using a keyword search of large patent databases, scientific papers and publications, and on any web search engine.  However, it is impossible to guarantee the novelty of an invention, even once a patent has been granted, since some little known publication may have disclosed the claimed invention.

Rationale

A patent grants an inventor a legally enforceable monopoly over their invention. This means that others can be legally restrained from exploiting the invention. It is not the intention of the patent system to deny anyone what they have been free to do before someone claims an invention. For example, one cannot patent the wheel, as that would exclude others from doing what they had previously been free to do. The legal test is that the invention must be something new, i.e. it must possess "novelty". The invention of the wheel is not new, because the wheel already forms part of the prior art.

Specific concepts

In some countries, such as the Australia, Canada, China, Japan, Russia, United States, a grace period exists for protecting an inventor or their successor in title from authorised or unauthorised disclosure of the invention before the filing date. That is, if the inventor or the successor in title publishes the invention, an application can still be validly filed which will be considered novel despite the publication, provided that the filing is made during the grace period following the publication. The grace period is usually 6 or 12 months. In China, the grace period is 6 months. In Russia, the grace period is 6 months (Civil Code part IV, article 1350 (3)). In USA, the grace period is 12 months ("Leahy-Smith America Invents Act")

In other countries, including European countries, any act that makes an invention available to the public, no matter where in the world, before the filing date or priority date has the effect of barring the invention from being patented. Examples of acts that can make an invention available to the public are written publications, sales, public oral disclosures and public demonstrations or use.

The grace period should not be confused with the priority year defined by Paris Convention for the Protection of Industrial Property. The priority year starts when the first filing in a contracting state of the Paris Convention is made, while the grace period starts from the pre-filing publication.

Local novelty only regards publications, uses or sales that have taken place within that jurisdiction to be novelty destroying.

Anticipation
Anticipation refers to advance use or disclosure of an otherwise-patentable invention, thereby undermining its novelty. The United Kingdom's House of Lords referred to "anticipation" as "convenient" terminology to cover "that part of the state of art which is inconsistent with the invention being new".

Point of novelty
Point of novelty is a term used in patent law to distinguish those elements or limitations in a patent claim that are conventional or known from those elements or limitations that are novel, i.e. not conventional or known. That part of the invention may also be termed its "point of departure from the prior art". The term is also applied to a patentability test--the point of novelty test--which determines patentability (usually, obviousness) by considering the point(s) of novelty after dissecting out the conventional part.

In a Jepson claim, the conventional parts of the claim elements are placed in a preamble, such as "In a grease gun comprising a cylinder enclosing a piston longitudinally movable in said cylinder, said cylinder having a nozzle at a distal end thereof", which is followed by a transitional phrase such as "the improvement comprising", which is followed by a recitation of the element or elements constituting the point of novelty, such as "said nozzle having a fluted opening at a distal end thereof".

A conceptual problem may arise in applying the point of novelty method of analysis when the elements at the point of novelty cooperate or co-act with the conventional elements or part of them in a novel way. The novel co-action is properly considered part of the point of novelty of the invention and should therefore properly be recited after the transitional phrase.

The United States Court of Appeals for the Federal Circuit formerly used the point of novelty test for design patents as the basis of a patent infringement analysis, but the court recently abandoned that test in Egyptian Goddess, Inc. v. Swisa, Inc. The Federal Circuit has at times criticized use of the point of novelty test in obviousness analysis, but the Supreme Court has continued to use a point of novelty test for obviousness. In Parker v. Flook the Supreme Court analyzed patent-eligibility (statutory subject matter) under a point of novelty test, citing Neilson v. Harford and O'Reilly v. Morse as authority, but in Diamond v. Diehr, the Court used the opposite approach. Then in Mayo v. Prometheus and Alice v. CLS Bank the Supreme Court went back to the test of the Flook case.

Present-day American patent law still acknowledges that some parts of a patent claim may constitute "insignificant post-solution activity". This is regarded as a kind of "point of novelty" approach, disallowed under present (Federal Circuit) patent law. To combat infringement, truly "insignificant" elements are routinely kept out of patent claims. The purpose of the patent-eligibility doctrine concerning insignificant post-solution activity, however, is that adding such limitations to a claim does not involve adding an "inventive concept" to the otherwise ineligible underlying idea.

The "contribution approach" in European patent law is similar to the American "point of novelty" approach. It is supposed to be invalid, but it is still being applied under various guises in order to avoid counter-intuitive results.

Jurisdictions

Canada 

In Canada, the requirements for novelty are codified under section 28.2 of the Patent Act (R.S.C., 1985, c. P-4):

The section does not restrict disclosure to prior patents, giving a broad description of what includes prior disclosure; so long as the subject-matter was disclosed “in such manner that the subject-matter became available to the public”, the subject-matter is barred from being patented. This may include prior patents, publications or the invention itself being put on display. Disclosures in a private document, such as an internal memo that is not available to the public, do not count.

There is an eight-pronged test to determine whether anticipation occurs in Canada. The prior art must:
give an exact prior description; 
give directions which will inevitably result in something within the claims; 
give clear and unmistakable directions; 
give information which for the purpose of practical utility is equal to that given by the subject patent; 
convey information so that a person grappling with the same problem must be able to say "that gives me what I wish"; 
give information to a person of ordinary knowledge so that he must at once perceive the invention; 
in the absence of explicit directions, teach an "inevitable result" which "can only be proved by experiments"; and 
satisfy all these tests in a single document without making a mosaic.
The current test now requires that only 1 of the 8 tests be fulfilled in order to find anticipation.

European Patent Convention

Under the European Patent Convention (EPC), European patents shall be granted for inventions which, among other things, are new.

United States 

In the United States the four most common ways in which an inventor will be barred under Section 102 are: 

 by making the invention known or allowing the public to use the invention; or
 having the invention published in a fixed medium (such as in a patent, patent application, or journal article); or
 if the invention was previously invented in the U.S. by another, who has not abandoned, suppressed, or concealed the invention, or
 if the invention was described in a patent application filed by another, where the application later issues as a US patent.

In U.S. patent law, a claim lacks novelty, and anticipation occurs when one prior art reference or event discloses all the features of a claim and enables one of ordinary skill in the art to make and use the invention. The term "features" in this context refers to the elements of art of the claim or its limitations as explained in the all elements rule.

A prior art reference must not only disclose every feature of a claim, but must also disclose the features arranged or combined in the same way as the claim.

See also 
 Analytic dissection - concept analogous to Point of novelty, but in copyright law
 Disclaimer (patent)
 Doctrine of inherency
 World Intellectual Property Organization

References

External links 
 Enlarged Concept of Novelty on the WIPO site
 Grace Period and Invention Law in Europe and Selected States , a comparative study of grace periods applicable for assessing novelty (by IPR-Helpdesk, a project of the European Commission DG Enterprise, co-financed within the fifth framework programme of the European Community)
British Patent Office regulations

Patent law